Clavatula rubrifasciata is a species of sea snail, a marine gastropod mollusk in the family Clavatulidae.

Description
The length of an adult shell varies between 23 mm and 38 mm.

This species was previously also regarded by Tryon as a variety of Clavatula muricata with a difference in color : the shell is yellowish brown, banded with bright red and ash-color.

Distribution
This species occurs in the Atlantic Ocean in the Gulf of Guinea and off Senegal, Gabon and Angola.

References

 Bernard, P.A. (Ed.) (1984). Coquillages du Gabon [Shells of Gabon]. Pierre A. Bernard: Libreville, Gabon. 140, 75 plates pp.
 Gofas, S.; Afonso, J.P.; Brandào, M. (Ed.). (S.a.). Conchas e Moluscos de Angola = Coquillages et Mollusques d'Angola. [Shells and molluscs of Angola]. Universidade Agostinho / Elf Aquitaine Angola: Angola. 140 pp

External links
 

rubrifasciata
Gastropods described in 1845